Impact is an album by  American jazz trumpeter Charles Tolliver's Music Inc. and Orchestra recorded in 1975 and first released on the Strata-East label.

Reception

The Allmusic review by Al Campbell awarded the album 4½ stars stating "Impact contained a stimulating progressive edge within an energetic large band (14 horns, eight strings, and rhythm section) format. Tolliver's arrangements are consistently bright and build momentum, while the soloists are given sufficient room to maneuver through the multiple textures".

Track listing
All compositions by Charles Tolliver
 "Impact" - 7:58
 "Mother Wit" - 8:21
 "Grand Max" - 6:22
 "Plight" - 9:47
 "Lynnsome" - 7:18
 "Mournin' Variations" - 8:13

Personnel
Charles Tolliver - trumpet, flugelhorn
James Spaulding - flute, alto saxophone
Harold Vick -  flute, soprano saxophone, tenor saxophone
Charles McPherson -  alto saxophone
George Coleman -  tenor saxophone
Charles Davis - baritone saxophone
Jon Faddis, Lorenzo Greenwich, Virgil Jones, Jimmy Owens, Richard Williams -  trumpet
Garnett Brown, John Gordon, Kiane Zawadi - trombone
Jack Jeffers - bass trombone
Stanley Cowell - piano
Clint Houston, Cecil McBee, Reggie Workman - bass
Clifford Barbaro - drums
Warren Smith  - chimes, percussion
Big Black, Billy Parker - percussion
Winston Collymore, Noel Da Costa, Gayle Dixon, Noel Pointer - violin
Julius Miller, Ashley Richardson - viola 
Akua Dixon Turre, Edith Wint Porter - cello

References

1975 albums
Charles Tolliver albums
Strata-East Records albums